Limnophilella is a genus of crane flies in the family Limoniidae.

Distribution
Ecuador, Peru, Brazil, Argentina, Chile, Panama & New Zealand.

Species
L. delicatula (Hutton, 1900)
L. diversipes (Alexander, 1921)
L. epiphragmoides (Alexander, 1913)
L. inquieta (Alexander, 1943)
L. mantissa (Alexander, 1966)
L. multipicta (Alexander, 1939)
L. patagonica Alexander, 1928
L. retractior Alexander, 1928
L. schunkeana (Alexander, 1948)
L. serotina (Alexander, 1922)
L. subvictor (Alexander, 1948)
L. victor (Alexander, 1919)

References

Limoniidae
Tipulomorpha genera
Diptera of South America
Diptera of Australasia
Insects of Central America
Invertebrates of Ecuador